Hathaura is a village in Siwan district, in the state of  Bihar, India.

The 2011 census recorded a population of 8461; 4314 males and 4147 females, giving a gender-ratio of 961 compared to the state average of 918.  There were 1456 children aged 0-6 and a literacy rate of 71.38 % compared the state average of 61.80 %. The village had no Scheduled Tribe population and 8.51% of the population were classified as Schedule Caste.

Hathaura Siwan lies 113km from the state capital at Patna, 9km south of the district headquarters at Siwan and 5km from the nearest town, Hussainganj, which has the nearest post office and police station.

The village is administrated by a Gram panchayat led by an elected Head of the Village or Sarpanch.

References

Villages in Siwan district